Maly Ergel is a rural locality (a selo) in Kostyukovsky Selsoviet of Svobodnensky District, Amur Oblast, Russia. The population was 29 as of 2018. There are 3 streets.

Geography 
Maly Ergel is located on the bank of the Maly Ergel River, 47 km west of Svobodny (the district's administrative centre) by road. Kostyukovka is the nearest rural locality.

References 

Rural localities in Svobodnensky District